First Ladies: Influence & Image is a 35-episode American television series produced by C-SPAN that originally aired from February 25, 2013 to February 10, 2014. Each episode originally aired live and looked at the life and times of one or more of the first ladies of the United States. Episodes featured interviews with historians, journalists, and other experts; included footage of locations significant to the featured first lady and interviews with several contemporary first ladies; and incorporated calls and tweets from viewers. C-SPAN has archived all video from the series to its website. It was produced in cooperation with the White House Historical Association, and was hosted by C-SPAN co-CEO Susan Swain.

In April 2015, PublicAffairs Books published the companion book First Ladies: Presidential Historians on the Lives of 45 Iconic American Women by Swain and C-SPAN. The network began re-airing the TV series on C-SPAN3 in April 2015.

Background and production

The series was executive produced by Mark Farkas, who also produced C-SPAN's series on presidents, unsuccessful candidates and the Abraham Lincoln-Stephen Douglas debates of 1858, and feature documentaries on the Capitol, White House and Supreme Court.  The idea for the series came from Richard Norton Smith, a presidential historian and former head of five presidential libraries. Norton Smith and historians William Seale, Rosalyn Terborg-Penn and Edith Mayo served as the show's academic advisors. Producer Andy Och, a video journalist, visited historic sites significant to the first ladies. Farkas and Och spoke with historians, archivists and curators. The show was hosted by C-SPAN co-CEO Susan Swain. Peter Slen hosted the program on Eleanor Roosevelt and co-hosted programs on Mamie Eisenhower, and Edith Wilson.

With First Ladies: Influence & Image, C-SPAN featured the history of the first ladies in chronological order during two seasons broadcast over the course of one year. Season 1, featuring Martha Washington through Ida McKinley, ran from February 25, 2013 to June 10, 2013. Three months later, the following season ran, featuring Edith Roosevelt through Michelle Obama, from September 9, 2013 to February 10, 2014. C-SPAN devoted most of the 90-minute episodes to a single first lady, but some early programs covered several within one broadcast. The Eleanor Roosevelt episode was 2 hours long.

The live broadcasts included commentary from in-studio historians, journalists and experts, as well as calls and interaction from viewers and social media users, and pre-recorded on-location footage at historical sites of significance to the featured first lady. The first season relied mainly on letters and written materials to provide insight into the first ladies’ lives. As the second season moved into modern times, the broadcasts included audio and video of the women.

First Ladies: Influence & Image delved into how FLOTUS' role has evolved since the 18th century. The series aimed to underscore how the presidents' wives—who were respectively fashion icons, advocates for their husbands, advisors and champions of their own causes—impacted political, social and White House history.

Programs

Other media

PublicAffairs Books published First Ladies: Presidential Historians on the Lives of 45 Iconic American Women, written by Susan Swain and C-SPAN, on April 14, 2015. The work pairs historians together to discuss the lives and legacies of the first ladies. 
A companion piece to the TV series, the book features historians' takes on the first ladies' personalities, marriages, passions and legacies. Kirkus Reviews said the 496-page book portrays where each first lady came from "and what was truly important to her".

C-SPAN and the White House Historical Association each launched websites to tie in with the series. The sites include essays, educational materials, videos, photographs and historical documents.

References

External links
Official White House Historical Association site

2010s American television talk shows
2013 American television series debuts
C-SPAN original programming
Cultural depictions of first ladies of the United States